Candlefuse are an American Christian alternative rock band from Rainsville, Alabama, where the group started making music in 1999. Their first release, Candlefuse, an extended play, was released in 2005. They have also released a studio album, Never Go Unheard, in 2006.

Background
The group started in 1999, in Rainsville, Alabama, where they are vocalist, Ben Honeycutt, guitarist, Drew Garrett, bassist, Steven Howell, and drummer, Brian Hechler. Their name comes from the bible verses, Matthew 5:14 and Psalm 133:1, in order to portray and reflect a solidarity of light to a darkened world.

Music history
They released an independently-made extended play, Candlefuse, in 2005. Their first studio album, Never Go Unheard, was released on October 17, 2006, from Infinity Records.

Members
 Ben Honeycutt – vocals
 Drew Garrett – guitar
 Steven Howell – bass
 Brian Hechler – drums (1999-2006)
 Bryant Davis - drums (2006-2007)

Discography
Studio albums
 Never Go Unheard (October 17, 2006, Infinity)

References

Alternative rock groups from Alabama
American Christian rock groups
1999 establishments in Alabama
Musical groups established in 1999